Kingdom of Heaven is a 2005 epic historical drama film directed and produced by Ridley Scott and written by William Monahan. It features an ensemble cast comprising Orlando Bloom, Eva Green, Ghassan Massoud, Jeremy Irons, David Thewlis, Brendan Gleeson, Edward Norton, Marton Csokas, Liam Neeson, Michael Sheen, Velibor Topić and Alexander Siddig.

The story is set immediately following the Second Crusade. A French village blacksmith goes to the aid of the Kingdom of Jerusalem in its defense against the Ayyubid Muslim Sultan, Saladin, who is fighting to reclaim the city from the Christians. The screenplay is a heavily fictionalised portrayal of the life of Balian of Ibelin (c. 1143–93).

Filming took place in Ouarzazate, Morocco, where Scott had previously filmed Gladiator (2000) and Black Hawk Down (2001), and in Spain, at the Loarre Castle (Huesca), Segovia, Ávila, Palma del Río, and Seville's Casa de Pilatos and Alcázar. The film was released on 6 May 2005, by 20th Century Fox and received mixed reviews upon theatrical release. It grossed $218 million worldwide. On 23 December 2005, Scott released a director's cut, which received critical acclaim, with many reviewers calling it the definitive version of the film.

Plot 

In 1184 France, Balian, a blacksmith, is haunted by his wife's recent suicide after the death of their unborn child. A Crusader passing through the village introduces himself as Balian's father, Baron Godfrey of Ibelin, and asks him to return with him to the Holy Land, but Balian declines. The town priest (Balian's half-brother) reveals that he ordered Balian's wife's body beheaded before burial. Upon discovering that the priest also stole his wife's crucifix, Balian kills him.

Balian joins his father, hoping to gain forgiveness and redemption for himself and his wife in Jerusalem. They are confronted by soldiers sent to arrest Balian and Godfrey is struck by an arrow. Reaching Messina, they have a contentious encounter with Guy de Lusignan, a prospective future king of Jerusalem. Godfrey knights Balian, names him the new Baron of Ibelin, and orders him to serve the King of Jerusalem and protect the helpless before succumbing to the arrow wound.

Balian's ship runs aground in a storm, leaving him the lone survivor. Balian is confronted by a Muslim cavalier who attacks him for his horse. Balian slays the man but spares his servant, who tells him that this mercy will gain him fame and respect among the Saracens.

Balian becomes acquainted with Jerusalem's political arena: the leper King Baldwin IV; Tiberias, the Marshal of Jerusalem; the King's sister, Princess Sibylla, Guy's wife and mother to a boy from an earlier marriage. Guy supports the brutal, anti-Muslim Knights Templar and intends to break the fragile truce between the King and the Muslim sultan Saladin. Balian travels to his inherited estate at Ibelin where the people struggle from lack of water. Balian works alongside the residents, using his engineering knowledge to irrigate the land, earning him their love and respect. Sibylla visits him and they become lovers.

In 1185, Guy and his ally, the cruel Raynald of Châtillon, attack a Saracen caravan, and Saladin advances on Raynald's castle Kerak in retaliation. At the king's request, Balian defends the villagers despite being overwhelmingly outnumbered. Captured, Balian encounters the servant he freed, learning he is actually Saladin's chancellor Imad ad-Din. Imad ad-Din releases Balian in repayment for his earlier mercy. Saladin and Baldwin negotiate a truce between their massive armies: a Muslim retreat in return for Raynald's punishment.

A weakened Baldwin asks Balian to marry Sibylla and take control of the army, but Balian refuses because it will require the execution of Guy and the Templars. Baldwin dies and is succeeded by Sibylla's son, now Baldwin V. Sibylla, as regent, intends to maintain peace with Saladin, but her son also develops leprosy. Devastated, Sibylla makes the heartrending decision to end her son's life by poisoning him while he sleeps in her arms. She hands the crown to Guy and withdraws.

Guy releases Raynald, who murders Saladin's sister. Guy declares war on the Saracens in 1187 and attempts to assassinate Balian, who barely survives. Guy marches to war despite Balian's advice to remain near Jerusalem's water sources. The Saracens annihilate the tired and dehydrated Crusaders in the ensuing desert battle. Saladin takes Guy captive, executes Raynald, and marches on Jerusalem. Tiberias leaves for Cyprus but Balian remains to protect the people, knighting every fighting man to inspire them. After a three-day siege, a frustrated Saladin parleys with Balian. When Balian reaffirms that he will destroy Jerusalem if Saladin does not accept his terms, Saladin agrees to allow the Christians to leave safely. They ponder if it would be better if the city were destroyed, leaving nothing left to fight over.

In the city, Balian is confronted by the humiliated Guy, and defeats him in a sword fight. He spares Guy's life, telling him to "rise a knight" as if he never were. Balian finds Sibylla, who has renounced her claim as queen, and they return to France. Afterwards, English knights en route to the Third Crusade meets Balian, the famed defender of Jerusalem. Balian tells Richard that he is merely a blacksmith. Balian and Sibylla pass by his wife's grave as they ride toward the unknown. An epilogue notes that "nearly a thousand years later, peace in the Kingdom of Heaven still remains elusive".

Cast 
Many of the characters in the film are fictionalised versions of historical figures:

 Orlando Bloom as Balian of Ibelin
 Eva Green as Sibylla of Jerusalem
 Jeremy Irons as Raymond III of Tripoli (“Tiberias”)
 David Thewlis as The Hospitaller
 Brendan Gleeson as Raynald of Châtillon (“Reynald”)
 Marton Csokas as Guy de Lusignan
 Edward Norton as King Baldwin IV of Jerusalem
 Michael Sheen as Priest
 Liam Neeson as Barisan of Ibelin (“Godfrey”)
 Velibor Topić as Amalric
 Ghassan Massoud as Saladin
 Alexander Siddig as Imad ad-Din al-Isfahani
 Khaled Nabawy as Mullah
 Kevin McKidd as English Sergeant
 Michael Shaeffer as Young Sergeant
 Jon Finch as Patriarch Heraclius of Jerusalem
 Ulrich Thomsen as Gerard de Ridefort (“Templar Master”)
 Nikolaj Coster-Waldau as Village Sheriff
 Martin Hancock as Gravedigger
 Nathalie Cox as Balian's Wife
 Eriq Ebouaney as Firuz
 Jouko Ahola as Odo
 Giannina Facio as Saladin's sister
 Philip Glenister as Squire
 Bronson Webb as Apprentice
 Steven Robertson as Angelic Priest
Iain Glen as Richard I of England (Richard Coeur de Lion)
 Angus Wright as Richard's Knight

Production

Cinematography 
The visual style of Kingdom of Heaven emphasises set design and impressive cinematography in almost every scene. It is notable for its "visually stunning cinematography and haunting music".
Cinematographer John Mathieson created many large, sweeping landscapes, where the cinematography, supporting performances, and battle sequences are meticulously mounted.
The cinematography and scenes of set-pieces have been described as "ballets of light and color", drawing comparisons to Akira Kurosawa.
Director Ridley Scott's visual acumen was described as the main draw of Kingdom of Heaven, with the "stellar" and "stunning" cinematography and "jaw-dropping combat sequences" based on the production design of Arthur Max.

Visual effects 
British visual effects firm Moving Picture Company completed 440 effects shots for the film. Additionally, Double Negative also contributed to complete the CGI work on the film.

Music 

The music differs in style and content from the soundtrack of Scott's earlier 2000 film Gladiator and many other subsequent films depicting historical events. A combination of medieval, Middle Eastern, contemporary classical, and popular influences, the soundtrack is largely the work of British film-score composer Harry Gregson-Williams. Jerry Goldsmith's "Valhalla" theme from The 13th Warrior and "Vide Cor Meum" (originally used by Scott in Hannibal and composed by Patrick Cassidy and Hans Zimmer), sung by Danielle de Niese and Bruno Lazzaretti, were used as replacements for original music by Gregson-Williams.

Reception

Critical response 
Upon its release it was met with a mixed reception, with many critics being divided on the film. Critics such as Roger Ebert found the film's message to be deeper than that of Scott's Gladiator.

The cast was widely praised. Jack Moore described Edward Norton's performance as the leper-King Baldwin as "phenomenal", and "so far removed from anything that he has ever done that we see the true complexities of his talent". The Syrian actor Ghassan Massoud was praised for his portrayal of Saladin, described in The New York Times as "cool as a tall glass of water". Also commended were Eva Green, who plays Princess Sibylla "with a measure of cool that defies her surroundings", and Jeremy Irons.

Lead actor Bloom's performance generally elicited a lukewarm reception from American critics, with the Boston Globe stating Bloom was "not actively bad as Balian of Ibelin", but nevertheless "seems like a man holding the fort for a genuine star who never arrives". Other critics conceded that Balian was more of a "brave and principled thinker-warrior" than a strong commander, and that he used brains rather than brawn to gain advantage in battle.

Bloom had gained 20 pounds for the part, and the extended director's cut (detailed below) of Kingdom of Heaven reveals even more complex facets of Bloom's role, involving connections with unknown relatives. Despite the criticism, Bloom won two awards for his performance.

Online, general criticism has been also divided. Review aggregation website Rotten Tomatoes gives the film a score of 39% based on reviews from 191 critics, with an average rating of 5.60/10. The site's critical consensus reads: "Although it's an objective and handsomely presented take on the Crusades, Kingdom of Heaven lacks depth." Review aggregator Metacritic gives the film a 63/100 rating based on 40 reviews, indicating "generally favorable reviews" according to the website's weighted average system.

Academic critique 

In the time since the film's release, scholars have offered analysis and criticisms through a lens situating Kingdom of Heaven within the context of contemporary international events and religious conflict, including: broad post-9/11 politics, neocolonialism, Orientalism, the Western perspective of the film, and the detrimental handling of differences between Christianity and Islam.

Academic criticism has focused on the supposed peaceful relationship between Christians and Muslims in Jerusalem and other cities depicted. Historians of the Crusades such as Jonathan Riley-Smith, quoted by The Daily Telegraph, described the film as "dangerous to Arab relations", calling the film "Osama bin Laden's version of history", which would "fuel the Islamic fundamentalists". Riley-Smith further commented against the historical accuracy, stating that "the fanaticism of most of the Christians in the film and their hatred of Islam is what the Islamists want to believe. At a time of inter-faith tension, nonsense like this will only reinforce existing myths", arguing that the film relied on the romanticized view of the Crusades propagated by Sir Walter Scott in his book The Talisman, published in 1825 and now discredited by academics, "which depicts the Muslims as sophisticated and civilized, and the Crusaders are all brutes and barbarians. It has nothing to do with reality". Paul Halsall defended Ridley Scott, claiming that "historians can't criticize filmmakers for having to make the decisions they have to make ... [Scott is] not writing a history textbook".

Thomas F. Madden, Director of Saint Louis University's Center for Medieval and Renaissance Studies, criticised the film's presentation of the Crusades:

Scott himself defended this depiction of the Muslim–Christian relationship in footage on the DVD version of the movie's extra features—Scott sees this portrayal as being a contemporary look at the history. He argued that peace and brutality are concepts relative to one's own experience, and since contemporary society is so far removed from the brutal times in which the movie takes place, he told the story in a way that he felt was true to the source material, yet was more accessible to a modern audience. In other words, the "peace" that existed was exaggerated to fit modern ideas of what such a peace would be. At the time, it was merely a lull in Muslim–Christian violence compared to the standards of the period. The recurring use of "Assalamu Alaikum", the traditional Arabic greeting meaning "Peace be with you", is spoken both in Arabic and English several times.

The "Director's Cut" of the film is a four-disc set, two of which are dedicated to a feature-length documentary called The Path to Redemption. This feature contains an additional featurette on historical accuracy called "Creative Accuracy: The Scholars Speak", where a number of academics support the film's contemporary relevance and historical accuracy. Among these historians is Dr. Nancy Caciola, who said that despite the various inaccuracies and fictionalised/dramatized details, she considered the film a "responsible depiction of the period."

Screenwriter William Monahan, who is a long-term enthusiast of the period, has said "If it isn't in, it doesn't mean we didn't know it ... What you use, in drama, is what plays. Shakespeare did the same."

Caciola agreed with the fictionalisation of characters on the grounds that "crafting a character who is someone the audience can identify with" is necessary in a film. She said that "I, as a professional, have spent much time with medieval people, so to speak, in the texts that I read; and quite honestly there are very few of them that if I met in the flesh I feel that I would be very fond of."

John Harlow of The Times wrote that Christianity is portrayed in an unfavourable light and the value of Christian belief is diminished, especially in the portrayal of Patriarch Heraclius of Jerusalem.

Box office 
The film was a box office disappointment in the US and Canada, earning $47.4 million against a budget of around $130 million, but did better in Europe and the rest of the world, earning $164.3 million, with the worldwide box office earnings totalling at $211,643,158. It was also a success in Arabic-speaking countries, especially Egypt. Scott insinuated that the US failure of the film was the result of poor advertising, which presented the film as an adventure with a love story rather than as an examination of religious conflict. It has also been noted that the film was altered from its original version to be shorter and follow a simpler plot line. This "less sophisticated" version is what hit theatres, although Scott and some of his crew felt it was watered down, explaining that by editing, "You've gone in there and taken little bits from everything".

Accolades

Extended director's cut 
Unhappy with the theatrical version of Kingdom of Heaven (which he blamed on paying too much attention to the opinions of preview audiences, and acceding to Fox's request to shorten the film by 45 minutes), Ridley Scott supervised a director's cut of the film, which was released on 23 December 2005 at the Laemmle Fairfax Theatre in Los Angeles, California. Unlike the mixed critical reception of the film's theatrical version, the Director's Cut received overwhelmingly positive reviews from film critics, including a four-star review in the British magazine Total Film and a ten out of ten from IGN DVD. Empire magazine called the reedited film an "epic", adding, "The added 45 minutes in the director's cut are like pieces missing from a beautiful but incomplete puzzle." One reviewer suggested it is the most substantial director's cut of all time and James Berardinelli wrote that it offers a much greater insight into the story and the motivations of individual characters. "This is the one that should have gone out" reflected Scott.

The DVD of the extended director's cut was released on 23 May 2006. It comprises a four-disc box set with a runtime of 194 minutes, and is shown as a roadshow presentation with an overture and intermission in the vein of traditional Hollywood epic films. The first Blu-ray release omitted the roadshow elements, running at 189 minutes, but they were restored for the 2014 'Ultimate Edition' release.

Scott gave an interview to STV on the occasion of the extended edition's UK release, when he discussed the motives and thinking behind the new version. Asked if he was against previewing in general in 2006, Scott stated: "It depends who's in the driving seat. If you've got a lunatic doing my job, then you need to preview. But a good director should be experienced enough to judge what he thinks is the correct version to go out into the cinema."

Significant subplots were added as well as enhanced character relationships. The priest Balian kills at the beginning of the film is revealed to be his half-brother, while the lord presiding over Balian's hometown is revealed to be Godfrey's brother. Battle scenes are depicted with more violence than in the theatrical cut. More scenes with the Hospitaller offering guidance to Balian were added back in. The most significant addition was the subplot involving Sibylla's son Baldwin V, who becomes the first to inherit the throne of Jerusalem following the passing of Baldwin IV, but is shown to be afflicted with leprosy just like his uncle before him, so Sibylla peacefully poisons him to prevent him from suffering as his predecessor did. The gravedigger from Balian's hometown is given more attention: he is shown to be philosophical at the beginning of the film, and is shown to follow Balian to Jerusalem to seek salvation like Balian, who acknowledges his presence and personally knights him before the final siege. Finally, a final fight is shown between Balian and Guy, where Balian wins but spares Guy, leaving him dishonoured.

Historical accuracy 

Scott, possibly anticipating criticism of historical accuracy, said: "Story books are what we base our movies on, and what we base our characters on." The story of Balian of Ibelin was heavily fictionalized; the historical Balian was not a French artisan but a prominent lord in the Kingdom of Jerusalem. The characters of Godfrey of Ibelin and the Hospitaller were wholly invented, while the stories of others were "tweaked"; for example, Raynald of Châtillon's responsibility for the Christian defeat is downplayed in order to make Guy "more of an autonomous villain".

The historical Sibylla was devoted to Guy, but the filmmakers wanted the character to be "stronger and wiser". Some have said that the character of Sibylla was reimagined to fit the trope of exotic Middle Eastern woman, whereas historically Sibylla and Baldwin belonged to a distinctly Western class that sought to set themselves apart from Middle Eastern culture. Moreover, while described in contemporary accounts as a young man vigorous in spite of his leprosy, King Baldwin is portrayed in the film as passive, androgynous, and bound to his chamber.

See also 

 List of Islam-related films
 Lists of historical films
 Battle of Hattin
 Siege of Jerusalem (1187)

References

Bibliography

External links 

 
 
 
 

2005 films
2000s action drama films
2000s action war films
2000s historical action films
2000s war drama films
20th Century Fox films
Action films based on actual events
American action drama films
American epic films
American war drama films
Arabic-language films
British epic films
British action drama films
British historical action films
British war drama films
Crusades films
Cultural depictions of Richard I of England
Cultural depictions of Saladin
Drama films based on actual events
English-language German films
Epic films based on actual events
Films about Christianity
Films scored by Harry Gregson-Williams
Films about death
Films about Islam
Films about religion
Films about violence
Films directed by Ridley Scott
Films set in Jerusalem
Films set in Palestine (region)
Films set in Israel
Films set in France
Films set in Sicily
Films set in Cyprus
Films set in the 12th century
Films shot in Morocco
Films with screenplays by William Monahan
Fratricide in fiction
German epic films
German historical films
Latin-language films
American historical action films
Scott Free Productions films
War epic films
War films based on actual events
Films shot in the province of Ávila
Historical epic films
2005 drama films
Films shot in the province of Huesca
2000s American films
2000s British films
2000s German films